This is a list of fastest known times for Pyrenees routes and summits.

Background
The Fastest Known Time (FKT) stands for the speed record on any given summit or traverse, usually in the mountains. The term FKT has gained popularity in the last years, specially in alpinism and mountain running, ranging from summiting a single peak to long-distance trails.

FKTs are usually difficult to compare and verify. While conditions in the mountains are very different on each season, and year after year (due to global warming), it is only considered the fastest time, no matter the weather. Additionally, style/support (if received) is detailed due to its relevance.

Besides those limitations, the evolution of FKTs is interesting, like any speed record in atlethics, to be aware of the human progress. 

Credit to any activity should only be given if some sort of data is provided (GPS track, pictures, videos, etc.).

List

References

Pyrenees
Climbing and mountaineering-related lists
Mountain running